José Manuel Carpinteiro (born 1 October 1930) is a Portuguese former sports shooter. He competed in the 25 metre pistol event at the 1964 Summer Olympics.

References

External links
 

1930 births
Possibly living people
Portuguese male sport shooters
Olympic shooters of Portugal
Shooters at the 1964 Summer Olympics
Place of birth missing (living people)